Mohammad Umar (born 27 December 1999) is a Pakistani cricketer. He made his first-class debut for Karachi Whites in the 2018–19 Quaid-e-Azam Trophy on 1 September 2018. He made his List A debut for Karachi Whites in the 2018–19 Quaid-e-Azam One Day Cup on 6 September 2018. He made his Twenty20 debut on 21 February 2021, for Multan Sultans in the 2021 Pakistan Super League.

References

External links
 

1999 births
Living people
Pakistani cricketers
Karachi Whites cricketers
Multan Sultans cricketers
Peshawar Zalmi cricketers
Sindh cricketers
Place of birth missing (living people)